Nevruz Day is celebrated annually in Albania on 22 March as Sultan Nevruz. In Albania, the festival commemorates the birthday of Ali ibn Abi Talib (died 661 CE) and simultaneously the advent of spring. Declared a public holiday in 1996, it is prominent amongst the nations' Bektashis (because of their Shia affiliations), but adherents of Sunnism, Catholicism, and Orthodoxy also "share in the Nevruz festival to respect the ecumenical spirit of Albania". Amongst these three non-Bektashis, the Sunni community of Albania appears to be greatest supporter of Nevruz. The "League of Imams in Albania" is opposed to the festivity, and they call it a pagan festival with pagan origins; they believe that only the festivals of Eid al-Fitr and the Eid al-Adha should be celebrated. Proselytism funded by Wahhabis and Saudis contributed to the spreading of this Islamic interpretation, which, although not necessarily fundamentalist, "strongly dissaproves of Baktāshi rituals and practices considered alien to Islam, including the Nevruz".

According to Gianfranco Bria:

During the 1990s
On the occasion of the Nevruz festival of 1991, the Kryegjyshata (Bektashi headquarters) in Tirana was reopened after the Communist period, in a moving ceremony that was attended by Mother Teresa. During the Nevruz festival of 1999, Naim Frashëri (1846 – 1900), the prominent Albanian writer and patriot of the Albanian national movement, who was also a Bektashi, was nearly canonised as "Baba of Honour".

International influence
Prominent Bektashi figureheads have organized public celebrations of Nevruz and Ashura, in order to "forge a link between creed, nation and progressivism". Some foreign factors, such as the Iranian Embassy in Albania and some Alevi networks, have often voiced support for these public initiatives and rituals. The Iranian government is known to have given cultural and political support in order to extend its own influence in the Balkans, without, however, affecting Bektashi autonomy.

References

Sources
 
 
 
 

Nowruz
Society of Albania
Bektashi Order
Public holidays in Albania